In 2017 in Ethiopia, 40% of girls are married off before 18 years old. 14% are married before they turn 15. Ethiopia is the 16th highest nation in the world for child marriage.

Causes 
Although other countries have taken efforts to end child marriage by establishing new laws that criminalize the practice, such preventative actions have not occurred in Ethiopia because of its semi-organized system on child marriage. Some of the main reasons why Ethiopia continues to allow child marriage practices is due to religious beliefs, traditional norms, lack of education, and economic reliance while technically still being illegal.

Ethiopia is just another example of a developing country in which extreme poverty leads to child marriages. Originally, child marriage was a custom that occurred between two wealthy families. Rich people were attracted to early marriage as a way to establish an alliance with two strong households in order to ensure land and cattle for their offspring. Nonetheless, this trend gradually decreased with the loss of resources in rural Ethiopia and the increase of poverty.

The financial struggle that families often find themselves with is not in their control. Several families are forced into poverty because of the loss of a parent. It has been discovered that one in five out of the total of 3,000 Ethiopian children have been orphaned of at least one parent. There is also the possibility that the child is from a drought-stricken rural area, these communities tend to have higher poverty rates which directly increase the child marriage rates.

One of the biggest arguments as to why child marriage still occurs in Ethiopia is because of its presence in history and traditional practices often seen in rural Ethiopia. It is important to understand that since child marriage has been around since the beginning of Ethiopian civilization it has become normalized in rural society, even encouraged. In 2001, UNICEF reported that some parents prefer to give away their daughters at a young age as a protective measure. Young girls in Ethiopia are constantly faced with the reality of being abducted, raped, and having unwanted pregnancies. So much so that parents feel more comfortable allowing their child to enter a legitimate marriage where her husband can serve as a protector. Extramarital sex is one of the biggest things that parents try to prevent with their daughters. Reasons for this include sexually transmitted diseases and risk of pregnancy but the main reason is in order to protect the honor of the girl and her family. It is because of this that a common belief is that if girls were married before they reached puberty and hit sexual maturity they are less likely to be promiscuous. 

Child marriage is actually considered the preferred preventive method compared to more drastic practices such as female genital mutilation.  This fear is only validated by the continued practice of a tradition that allows men to abduct girls and force them to become their bride. This act commonly known as bride napping is seen in several developing countries but is especially prevalent in the countryside of Ethiopia. Often when men are too poor to afford a dowry they simply kidnap the bride of their choice and force her into marriage. Men usually gather their friends and ride on horseback to go and collect their future wives while they walk home from grade school. Once they have successfully obtained the girl the husband to be takes the liberty of raping his young wife and claiming her as his own. This is seen as a form of courtship because once a girl has lost her virginity in Ethiopian culture she is seen as impure and tainted for other men. This abduction process is overseen by the local council of elders who have final say in most matters and tend to agree with abduction practices, basing their decisions on tradition and culture. Ethiopian culture contains several groups of thought that promote the occurrence of child marriage such as the idea that “a girl who is not married by late adolescence represents a failure and disgrace to the family. In particular, the status of the girl's father is compromised, and he is considered a failure when his daughter remains unmarried into her late teens”. The emphasis on family, honor, and purity are all themes in Ethiopian culture that heavily influence societal opinions and practices.

Religion is yet another large component as to why child marriage is a remaining custom in rural Ethiopia. Acceptance of child marriage is majorly seen in the Ethiopian Muslim community. Muslims who support child marriage claim that their religion and the Shariah allows girls to marry at a young age.

References

Ethiopia
Childhood in Africa
Society of Ethiopia
Marriage in Africa